Newport East may refer to:

Newport East, Rhode Island in the United States
Newport East, a United Kingdom Parliament constituency
Newport East, a Senedd constituency